Lucy Mansel (c.1831–22 January 1916) was a New Zealand homemaker and community worker. She was born in County Clare, Ireland on c.1831.

References

1830s births
1916 deaths
Irish emigrants to New Zealand (before 1923)
People from County Clare
19th-century New Zealand people